Papilio chrapkowskoides, the broadly green-banded swallowtail, is a species of swallowtail butterfly from the genus Papilio that is found in the Republic of the Congo, Uganda, Rwanda, Burundi, Tanzania, Guinea, Sierra Leone, Liberia, Ivory Coast, Ghana, Togo, Benin, Nigeria, Cameroon, Gabon, the Democratic Republic of the Congo, and Angola.

Description
The blue or greenish median band of the upper surface is broad, 10—14 mm. broad 
at the hindmargin of the forewing, 10—17 mm. in the middle of the hindwing and distinctly widened posteriorly; the spot in cellule 2 of the hindwing always completely covers the base of the cellule and the spot in 1 c is very long and always reaches the cell. The green-blue spot in the cell of the forewing above reaches basad at least to the middle of cellule 2; forewing beneath without large yellowish submarginal spots, at the most with a few small spots near to the margin. Sierra Leone to the Congo region and Equatoria.

Biology
The larvae feed on Calodendrum capense, Vepris, and Citrus species.

Subspecies
Papilio chrapkowskoides chrapkowskoides (eastern Congo Republic, south-western Uganda, Rwanda, Burundi, western Tanzania)
Papilio chrapkowskoides nurettini  Koçak, 1983  (Guinea, Sierra Leone, Liberia, Ivory Coast, Ghana, Togo, Benin, Nigeria, Cameroon, Gabon, Congo, Angola, Central African Republic, Congo Republic, western Uganda)
Papilio chrapkowskoides nerminae Koçak, 1983 (São Tomé and Principe)

Papilio chrapkowskoides nerminae is treated as a full species by some authors.

Taxonomy
Papilio chrapkowskoides is a member of the Papilio genus, of which Papilio appalachiensis and Papilio xuthus are also members. Papilio chrapkowskoides belongs to a clade called the nireus species group with 15 members. The pattern is black with green or blue bands and spots and the butterflies, although called swallowtails lack tails with the exception of Papilio charopus and Papilio hornimani. The clade members are:

Papilio aristophontes Oberthür, 1897
Papilio nireus Linnaeus, 1758 
Papilio charopus Westwood, 1843
Papilio chitondensis de Sousa & Fernandes, 1966 
Papilio chrapkowskii Suffert, 1904
Papilio chrapkowskoides Storace, 1952 
Papilio desmondi van Someren, 1939 
Papilio hornimani Distant, 1879
Papilio interjectana Vane-Wright, 1995
Papilio manlius Fabricius, 1798 
Papilio microps Storace, 1951
Papilio sosia Rothschild & Jordan, 1903
Papilio thuraui Karsch, 1900
Papilio ufipa Carcasson, 1961
Papilio wilsoni Rothschild, 1926

Description
Reflecting the confused separation between Papilio bromius and P. chrapkowskii. Very similar to P. chrapkowskii, but pale mottling and submarginal spots below not so well developed. Cilia of forewing black, not white, as in P. chrapkowskii. A somewhat unstable race with frequent transitions to the two previous races: P. bromius and P. chrapkowskii.

References

chrapkowskoides
Butterflies described in 1952